Death Toll is a 2008 action film starring DMX, Lou Diamond Phillips, Alec Rayme, Leila Arcieri and Keshia Knight Pulliam, written and produced by Daniel Garcia and directed by Phenomenon. Filming was done in Louisiana in New Orleans and Baton Rouge.

Plot
A powerful drug dealer has taken control of New Orleans, but as the authorities scramble to stop the bloodshed things only get worse on the streets. "The Dog" (DMX) is a drug dealer who will stop at nothing to be the number one bad boy in the Big Easy. His ruthlessness is legendary, and his power far reaching. But the authorities are onto "The Dog," and now the time has come to put this pit-bull to sleep. Will they accomplish their mission before any more innocent lives are lost, or could it be that New Orleans' top dog is truly above the law?

Cast

 Lou Diamond Phillips as Mayor Padial
 DMX as The Dog
 Keshia Knight Pulliam as Mirie
 Leila Arcieri as Detective Bathgate
 Alec Rayme as Detective Coulon
 Daniel Garcia as Carmello
 Sleman Sol Virani as The Dominican
 Lisa Marie Dupree as Agent Manning
 Margo Swisher as AUSA Stone
 Oneal A. Isaac as Chief Newsome
 Gene Christensen as Councilmen McGraw
 Jeff Galpin as Special Agent Sax

Reception
DVD Verdict panned Death Toll, stating that it was "a collection of moving images that makes little sense and boasts the entertainment value of a wasp sting to the genitals."

Dutch language Cinemagazine spoke of the film sharing a great deal of violence, and expanded that the story was not as good as it might have been. A large cast and quick cuts between cast action sequences and a weak script marred the viewer's attention.

See also 
 List of hood films

References

External links 
 
 

2008 action films
2008 films
American action films
American crime drama films
Hood films
2000s English-language films
2000s American films